The 1996–97 San Jose Sharks season was the Sharks' sixth season of operation in the National Hockey League. The Sharks again failed to make the playoffs, finishing 13th in the Western Conference.

Offseason
Defenseman Todd Gill was named team captain, following the departure of Jeff Odgers.

Regular season

On October 18, the Sharks scored three short-handed goals in a 4-1 win over the Mighty Ducks of Anaheim.

The Sharks finished the regular season last in scoring (211 goals for) and had the most power-play opportunities against (409).

Final standings

Schedule and results

Player statistics

Note: Pos = Position; GP = Games played; G = Goals; A = Assists; Pts = Points; +/- = plus/minus; PIM = Penalty minutes; PPG = Power-play goals; SHG = Short-handed goals; GWG = Game-winning goals
      MIN = Minutes played; W = Wins; L = Losses; T = Ties; GA = Goals-against; GAA = Goals-against average; SO = Shutouts; SA = Shots against; SV = Shots saved; SV% = Save percentage;

Awards and records

Transactions

Draft picks

See also
1996–97 NHL season

References
 

S
S
San Jose Sharks seasons
National Hockey League All-Star Game hosts
San Jose Sharks
San Jose Sharks